According to the Official Gazette, international trips made by the President of the Philippines are an opportunity to "foster and maintain" relations with other governments and to meet other heads of state and/or government. The Department of Foreign Affairs classifies these trips as either a state visit, an official visit, or a working visit.

Bongbong Marcos, the 17th and current president, has made nine international trips to nine countries during his presidency so far, which began on June 30, 2022. More trips have been planned.

Unless otherwise stated, the President was accompanied by First Lady Liza Araneta Marcos and his first cousin, House Speaker Martin Romualdez, on all his trips. Former president and deputy house speaker Gloria Macapagal Arroyo joined the presidential delegation of all trips since November 16, 2022.

Summary
The number of visits per country where President Marcos travelled are:
 One: Belgium, Cambodia, China, Indonesia, Japan, Switzerland, Thailand, and the United States
 Two: Singapore

2022

2023

Critical reactions 
Marcos received criticism for his unannounced visit to Singapore, where he attended the 2022 Singapore Grand Prix. Kilusang Mayo Uno criticized him by saying that the trip was incredibly insensitive in time where FIlipinos were grappling with record-high inflation as well as dealing with the aftermath of another violent super typhoon [Noru] which occurred a week before Marcos' visit to Singapore. Bayan Secretary General Renato Reyes questioned why the palace had not announced Marcos' visit to Singapore if the trip was of an official nature. Noting that explanations and statements were only provided by officials when the news broke to the public that Marcos was in Singapore unannounced. The Palace refrained from releasing a statement on the matter even as images circulated on social media of Marcos, his family and some of his staff attending the event.  When Marcos released a statement on the matter, he deflected criticisms by noting that his trip was meant to drum up business relations, saying "They say that playing golf is the best way to drum up business, but I say it's Formula 1."  An unnamed palace official spoke to AP News saying that Marcos and his family took a military jet primarily to watch the Grand Prix. The official also noted that this was Marcos' third trip since winning the presidency in May 2022.

Several opposition lawmakers have described Marcos' string of international trips as more an attempt to "rehabilitate and repackage" his family's image rather than to make efforts to uplift the lives of Filipinos. Congresswoman France Castro stated that "By hobnobbing with the current movers and shakers of the world, the President is slowly trying to erase the corruption-laden and human rights violations-rife name of his father." She criticized the Marcoses for speaking of prioritizing food security, while Filipino farmers are unable to own the land they farm. She also noted of the rapid conversion of farmland to residential and commercial zones by Marcos' allies.

Multilateral meetings
Multilateral meetings of the following intergovernmental organizations that the Philippines is a member of (or invited to) are scheduled to take place during Marcos' term in office.

See also
 Foreign policy of the Philippines
 Foreign relations of the Philippines
 List of international presidential trips made by Gloria Macapagal Arroyo
 List of international presidential trips made by Benigno Aquino III
 List of international presidential trips made by Rodrigo Duterte

References

2022 in international relations
Marcos, Bongbong
Presidency of Bongbong Marcos
Bongbong Marcos administration controversies